The , often shortened to , is a group formed by hibakusha in 1956 with the goals of pressuring the Japanese government to improve support of the victims and lobbying governments for the abolition of nuclear weapons.

Honors
2010: Award for Social Activism (World Summit of Nobel Peace Laureates)
1985, 1994, 2015: the Swiss-based International Peace Bureau (IPB) nominated Hidankyo for the Nobel Peace Prize.

See also
Hibakusha
Anti-nuclear movement
Atomic bombings of Hiroshima and Nagasaki

References

External links
 Nihon Hidankyō
 HIBAKUSHA - Atomic Bomb Survivors
 United Nations Secretary-General Ban Ki-moon's Statements

Anti-nuclear organizations
Anti–nuclear weapons movement
Hibakusha
Organizations established in 1956
1956 establishments in Japan